The third season of the American comedy television series Silicon Valley premiered in the United States on HBO on April 24, 2016. The season contained 10 episodes, and concluded on June 26, 2016.

In the season, Richard once again becomes CEO of Pied Piper, after the excessive spending and questionable practices of Jack Barker, who briefly held the job. After leaving Pied Piper, Barker goes to work for Gavin Belson at Hooli. Erlich teams up with Big Head to create a new incubator, but the pairing quickly fails. Dinesh creates a video chat application within the Pied Piper platforms, which unexpectedly becomes popular.

Cast

Main 
Thomas Middleditch as Richard Hendricks
T.J. Miller as Erlich Bachman
Josh Brener as Nelson "Big Head" Bighetti
Martin Starr as Bertram Gilfoyle
Kumail Nanjiani as Dinesh Chugtai
Amanda Crew as Monica Hall
Zach Woods as Donald "Jared" Dunn
Matt Ross as Gavin Belson
Suzanne Cryer as Laurie Bream
Jimmy O. Yang as Jian-Yang

Recurring

Episodes

Production 
In April 2015, the series was renewed for a third season. In October 2015, it was reported that Stephen Tobolowsky had been cast in the recurring role of Jack Barker.

Reception

Critical response 
On review aggregator Rotten Tomatoes, the season holds a 100% approval rating, earning a "Certified Fresh" rating. It holds an average score of 8.88/10 based on 23 reviews. The site's critical consensus reads "Silicon Valleys satirical take on the follies of the tech industry is sharper than ever in this very funny third season." Similarly, on Metacritic, which uses a weighted average, holds a score of 90 out of 100, based on reviews from 15 critics, indicating "universal acclaim".

Rob Lowman of the Los Angeles Daily News, after the release of season 3, described the show as "one of the best comedies on television", saying that the show "works as both a sharp satire on the tech industry and a commentary on art versus commercialism". Likewise, in Vanity Fair, Laura Bradley praised the show's ability to mix comedy and drama, writing "Silicon Valley has all the urgency of a high-stakes prestige drama, but at its core, it's a comedy about hapless goobers."

Accolades 
In 2016, the series earned nine nominations at the 68th Primetime Emmy Awards, including for Outstanding Comedy Series, Outstanding Lead Actor in a Comedy Series (Middleditch), two for Outstanding Directing for a Comedy Series (Alec Berg for "Daily Active Users"; Mike Judge for "Founder Friendly"), two for Outstanding Writing for a Comedy Series (Dan O'Keefe for "Founder Friendly"; Alec Berg for "The Uptick"), Outstanding Casting for a Comedy Series, Outstanding Production Design, and Outstanding Sound Mixing.

Home media 
The third season was released on DVD and Blu-ray on April 11, 2017; bonus features include deleted scenes.

References

External links 
 
 

2016 American television seasons
Silicon Valley (TV series)